The Gemini Guidance Computer (sometimes Gemini Spacecraft On-Board Computer (OBC)) was a digital, serial computer designed for Project Gemini, America's second human spaceflight project. The computer, which facilitated the control of mission maneuvers, was designed by the IBM Federal Systems Division.

Functionality 
Project Gemini was the first with an on-board computer, as Project Mercury was controlled by computers on Earth. The Gemini Guidance Computer was responsible for the following functions:

 Ascent – serves as a backup guidance system. The switchover is manually controlled by the astronauts
 Orbital flight – provides a navigation capability to the astronauts to determine the time of retrofire and to select the landing site for safe reentry in the case of an emergency. (on extended missions ground data may become unavailable when ground data network rotates out of the orbital plane.)
 Rendezvous – serves as primary reference by providing guidance information to the astronauts. The orbit parameters are determined by the ground tracking which are then sent to the spacecraft; the guidance computer was responsible for processing the information along with sensed spacecraft attitude. The information was presented to the astronauts in terms of spacecraft coordinates.
 Reentry – feeds commands directly to the reentry control system for automatic reentry or provides the guidance information to the astronauts for manual reentry.

Specs 
 The computer was architecturally similar to the Saturn Launch Vehicle Digital Computer, in particular in the instruction set; however its circuit integration was less advanced. The GGC weighed 58.98 pounds (26.75 kg) and was powered by 28V DC. During a short power outage it could be powered by the Auxiliary Computer Power Unit (ACPU)
 39-bit words memory, each composed of three 13-bit syllables
 Ferrite core memory of 4096 words
 Two's complement integer arithmetic
 7.143 hertz clock (140 ms per instruction); all instructions took a single cycle except for multiplication and division

See also
 Apollo Guidance Computer

References

External links 

 Gemini Spacecraft On-Board Computer (OBC)
 Gemini Program Overview
 IBM and the Gemini Program

Project Gemini
Guidance computers
IBM avionics computers
Spacecraft navigation instruments